KD Sundang is the second ship of Keris-class littoral mission ship of the Royal Malaysian Navy. She built by Chinese company China Shipbuilding and Offshore International Co. Ltd based on enlarged and improved version of
Durjoy-class large patrol craft of the Bangladesh Navy. Currently, she in service with the 11th LMS Squadron based in Sepanggar, Sabah.

Development
Sundang was launched on 12 July 2019 in China and commissioned on 5 March 2021 in Malaysia. The ceremony completed by the Commander of the Navy, Admiral Tan Sri Mohd Reza Mohd Sany by reading the letter of commission and wearing the Commanding Insignia to the Commander Khairil Sarian, which is the first Commanding Officer of the Sundang.

References

2019 ships
Keris-class littoral mission ships
Ships built in China